A critical précis is an expository style of writing, analogous in structure to an essay but which contains a summary of another piece of text. In essence, the entire content summarizes all the main ideas, arguments and abstractions within the text into a shorter passage a fraction of its original length, in order to provide insight into the original author's thesis. The writer of the précis is careful to avoid copying any direct wording from the original text in order to avoid academic plagiarism, except in short passage quotations where necessary.

The précis is a common assignment in the humanities and liberal arts streams in higher education. Typical lengths are less than 500 to 1500 words.

The majority of higher education students find the précis to be a useful analytical format and tool. Its use also extends to interdisciplinary formats, and is sometimes also identified as a rhetorical précis.

Structure
Introduction
Cites the main text of work being analyzed, similar to a typical essay lead paragraph
Body
Explanation of key ideas, concepts and phrases, demonstrating the implied significance and purpose of the text using direct examples of how the author supports the thesis, often relating or contrasting to the reader's assumptions (this is not a creative interpretation)
Conclusion
Summarizes the main idea and importance of the original author's thesis, and the author's connections to the intended audience

The précis is written from an impartial third-person point of view, although personal analysis of a text can also be considered précis format. The analysis of ideas is usually in chronological order.

Example keywords
The opening paragraph follows a certain structure:
...the author...
asserts, argues, believes, claims, conveys the thought, declares, demonstrates, elucidates, expounds the idea, finds, identifies the fact, illustrates, implies, points out, posits, proposes, reports, reveals, states, suggests...that...
followed by a clause explaining the thesis. This clause is typically similar in scope to the concluding sentence of the final paragraph.

These words exemplify the use of rhetorically accurate verbs.

See also
Abstract (summary)
Axiom
Critical thinking
Microblogging
Rhetorical criticism
Syllogism

References

External links
Précis - University Writing Center, Texas A&M University
The Critical Précis - Troy University

Examples
Critical précis adaptation of Nietzsche's On the Genealogy of Morality, Allen Porter Mendenhall
Rhetorical Précis Examples - Gloria Dumler, Bakersfield College
Sample rhetorical precis - Oregon State University

Further reading
Woodworth, Margaret K. "The Rhetorical Precis." Rhetoric Review 7 (1988): 156-164. Print.

Writing
Criticism